Isaiah Faber (born March 31, 1999), known professionally as Powfu, is a Canadian rapper, songwriter, and record producer. He is the son of Dave Faber from the band Faber Drive. He amassed popularity following the release of his first charting single, "Death Bed (Coffee for Your Head)", featuring Beabadoobee which peaked at number 23 on the Billboard Hot 100.

Career
In February 2020, he released the song "Death Bed (Coffee for Your Head)", which featured a sample of Beabadoobee's debut single "Coffee". The single has received over 1 billion streams on Spotify as of June 2021, and peaked at number 23 on the Billboard Hot 100 after amassing popularity through the video-sharing app TikTok. After re-releasing the single a year after, Powfu signed with Columbia Records in the US, in conjunction with Robots + Humans in the United Kingdom. The song appeared on the EP Poems of the Past, which was released on May 29, 2020. 

On December 2, 2022, Powfu released his first full-length album surrounded by hounds and serpents, which included a cover of Taylor Swift's "Mine". In an interview with Billboard, he stated that this album title describes his search to spot "people who are fake or only want [him] for the wrong reasons".

Discography

Studio albums
 surrounded by hounds and serpents (2022)

Extended plays

Singles

As lead artist

As featured artist

Accolades

References

1999 births
Living people
Canadian male rappers
Musicians from Vancouver
21st-century Canadian rappers
21st-century Canadian male musicians
Columbia Records artists
Canadian indie pop musicians
Alternative rock singers
Canadian alternative rock musicians
Lo-fi musicians